Coleophora vacciniella is a moth of the family Coleophoridae. It is found from Fennoscandia and northern Russia to the Pyrenees and Italy and from France to Romania.

The larvae feed on Vaccinium myrtillus, Vaccinium uliginosum and Vaccinium vitis-idaea. Larvae can be found from July to autumn. Hibernation takes place in the case and pupation takes place shortly after winter.

References

vacciniella
Moths of Europe
Moths described in 1861